Follow the Lady is a 1933 British comedy film directed by Adrian Brunel and starring Marguerite Allan, William Hartnell and D. A. Clarke-Smith. A Frenchwoman attempts to blackmail a wealthy man. The film was a quota quickie, produced on commission from the Fox Film Corporation to allow them to meet their yearly quota.

Cast
 Marguerite Allan as Suzette
 D. A. Clarke-Smith as Flash Bob
 William Hartnell as Mike Martindale
 Marie Hemingway as Lady Saffron
 Vincent Holman as Parsons
 Basil Moss as Paul Barlow

References

Bibliography
 Chibnall, Steve. Quota Quickies: The Birth of the British 'B' film. British Film Institute, 2007.
 Low, Rachael. History of the British Film: Filmmaking in 1930s Britain. George Allen & Unwin, 1985.

External links

1933 films
1933 comedy films
British comedy films
Films directed by Adrian Brunel
Films set in England
British black-and-white films
1930s English-language films
1930s British films